Samuel Ogunsanya (born 1 March 1980) is a former Nigerian professional footballer.

Career
Ogunsanya made his debut in the Russian Premier League in 2002 for FC Spartak Moscow. He played 1 game in the UEFA Champions League 2002–03 for FC Spartak Moscow.

Honours
 CAF Champions League champion: 2003, 2004.
 Nigerian Premier League champion: 1998, 2002, 2003.
 Nigerian Premier League runner-up: 2000, 2004.
 Nigerian FA Cup winner: 2007.
 Russian Premier League bronze: 2002.

References

1980 births
Sportspeople from Lagos
Living people
Nigerian footballers
Nigerian expatriate footballers
Expatriate soccer players in the United States
Enyimba F.C. players
Nigerian expatriate sportspeople in the United States
FC Spartak Moscow players
Russian Premier League players
Expatriate footballers in Russia
Sharks F.C. players
Nigerian expatriate sportspeople in Russia
Dolphin F.C. (Nigeria) players
Katsina United F.C. players
Rangers International F.C. players
Association football defenders
Major Indoor Soccer League (2008–2014) players
Rockford Rampage players